The Public Construction Commission (PCC) is an independent government agency of the Executive Yuan of the Republic of China (Taiwan) which is responsible for planning, reviewing, coordination, and supervision of public construction projects such as roads, bridges, highways in Taiwan. The agency follows national goals such as sustainability, high-quality, efficient, reliable and competitive national infrastructure.

History
The agency was established in 1995 to oversee public works in Taiwan.

Administrative structure
The agency is organized into the following departments.
Department of Planning
Department of Technology
Department of Technology Management
Secretariat
Personnel Office
Accounting Office
Legal Affairs Committee
Petitions and Appeals Committee
Complaint Review Board for Government Procurement
Engineering Technique Corroboration Committee 
Professional Engineers Disciplinary Retrial Committee
Central Procurement Supervision Unit
Congressional Liaison Unit
Private Participation Unit

Ministers

 Arthur Y. Chen (20 July 1995 – 8 June 1996)
 Ou Chin-der (8 June 1996 – 25 December 1998)
 Lee Chien-chung (25 December 1998 – 27 January 1999) (acting)
 Tsay Jaw-yang (27 January 1999 – 20 May 2000)
 Lin Neng-pai (20 May 2000 – 1 February 2002)
 Kuo Yao-chi (1 February 2002 – 15 January 2006)
 Wu Tze-cheng (15 January 2006 – 20 May 2008)
 Fan Liang-shiow (May 2008 – April 2011)
 Lee Hong-yuan (April 2011 – February 2012)
 Chern Jenn-chuan (February 2012 – 1 August 2013)
 Yan Jeou-rong (1 August 2013 – 21 October 2013) (acting)
 Chen Shi-shuenn (22 October 2013 – 30 June 2014)
 Hsu Chun-yat (1 July 2014 – 19 May 2016) 
 Wu Hong-mo (20 May 2016 – 23 November 2017)
 Wu Tze-cheng (23 November 2017 –) (incumbent)

See also
 Executive Yuan
 Transportation in Taiwan

References

External links

Public Construction Commission

1995 establishments in Taiwan
Executive Yuan
Government agencies established in 1995
Independent government agencies of Taiwan